Matthew Joseph Stokoe (born 13 January 1989) is a British actor. He is best known for his roles as Alex in the Channel 4 series Misfits, crime boss Luke Aikens in the thriller Bodyguard, teacher Gerard Eyre in The Village, Captain Marcheaux in series 3 of The Musketeers for the BBC, and as James Read in the Sky 1 series Jamestown. In 2020, he played Gawain in the Netflix original series Cursed.

Filmography

Film

Television

Video games

Personal life
Stokoe is engaged to actress Sophie Rundle, whom he met on the set of Jamestown. Stokoe and Rundle welcomed their first child, a son, in April 2021.

References

External links
 
 

1989 births
Living people
21st-century English male actors
English male film actors
English male stage actors
English male television actors
English male video game actors
People from Durham, England
National Youth Theatre members